Manoba phaeochroa is a moth in the family Nolidae. It was described by George Hampson in 1900. It is found in Sikkim in India and in Thailand and possibly on Java.

References

Moths described in 1900
Nolinae